Vanderhoof may refer to:

Places
Vanderhoof, British Columbia, district municipality in British Columbia, Canada

People
John D. Vanderhoof (1922–2013), American banker and politician
Kurdt Vanderhoof (born 1961), American heavy metal musician